Mount Bigo is a 1,980 m mountain in Lisiya Ridge on Magnier Peninsula, Graham Coast in Graham Land, standing immediately southwest of Mount Perchot at the head of Bigo Bay. It was discovered by the French Antarctic Expedition of 1908–10 and named by Charcot probably for Robert Bigo of Calais, a member of the Ligue Maritime Française.

Maps

 British Antarctic Territory.  Scale 1:200000 topographic map. DOS 610 Series, Sheet W 65 64.  Directorate of Overseas Surveys, Tolworth, UK, 1971.

References
 SCAR Composite Gazetteer of Antarctica.

Mountains of Graham Land
Graham Coast